Same Day, Different Shit is the fifth studio album by American rapper Kurupt. It was released under the name Young Gotti, which was a nickname given to Kurupt by Tupac Shakur. He joined Daz's D.P.G. Recordz soon after the Western Conference in July 2005. The lyrics of all the tracks on this album are written by Kurupt, he had to use his brother's publishing Young Roscoe it is believed due to contract reasons, with help of Daz Dillinger.

Commercial performance
The album reached at number fifty-nine on the US Billboard R&B/Hip-Hop Albums charts in 2006.

Track listing

Sample credits
"Ryde & Roll" contains a sample of "Time Will Reveal" performed by DeBarge

Personnel
Credits for Same Day, Different Shit adapted from Allmusic.

 Alex "Toon" Deligiannis - Artwork, Design
 Daz Dillinger - Guest Artist, Primary Artist
 Adam Hill - Assistant Engineer
 I. Johnson - Composer
 Ivan Johnson - Producer
 Ashthon Jones - Primary Artist
 Kurupt - Primary Artist
 Fredwreck Nassar - Digital Photography
 Kevin Nick - Mastering
 Larry Nick - Mastering
 Lasoniata Shaw - Mixing
 Arnold "Bigg A" White - Promotions Director
 Young Gotti - Primary Artist

Chart positions

See also
 List of albums
 2006 in music

References

2006 albums
Kurupt albums